The 2011 Canadian Championship (officially the Nutrilite Canadian Championship) was a soccer tournament hosted and organized by the Canadian Soccer Association that took place in the cities of Edmonton, Montreal, Toronto and Vancouver in 2011. As in previous tournaments, participating teams included the Montreal Impact, Toronto FC and Vancouver Whitecaps FC. FC Edmonton participated in this year's competition for the first time. Toronto FC won the tournament, claiming the Voyageurs Cup and Canada's entry into the preliminary round of the 2011–12 CONCACAF Champions League. The tournament has been held annually since 2008.

The format of the 2011 tournament was different from previous editions. In 2011, with four teams involved, the tournament was changed to be a home-and-away semifinal round and a similar final round between the winners. Toronto, as reigning champions, were assigned the top seed and were matched with Edmonton, who were assigned the fourth seed as newcomers to the tournament. The two remaining teams, Montreal and Vancouver, faced off in the other semifinal.

Bracket

Matches

Semifinals

Vancouver Whitecaps FC won 2–1 on aggregate.

Toronto FC won 4–0 on aggregate.

Final

 

Toronto FC won 3–2 on aggregate.

Top goalscorers

References

External links
Official tournament website
Video Highlights

2011 domestic association football leagues
1
2011
2011–12 CONCACAF Champions League